Émile Baumann (24 November 1868 – 24 November 1941) was a French writer.

Biography
Baumann was born in Lyons in 1868. He was descended from a Lutheran family converted to Catholicism. In Algiers he met Saint-Saëns, and devoted his first work to him. He was directly involved in the Catholic Literary Renaissance movement, alongside such people as François Mauriac, Paul Claudel and Pierre Reverdy. Sister Mary Keeler, in her Catholic Literary France says that of all French novelists of the time Baumann was perhaps the most completely Catholic. He was awarded the Prix Balzac in 1922 for his novel Job le Prédestiné. In 1931 he married the engraver and artist Elisabeth de Groux, daughter of Belgian painter Henry de Groux.

He died in Vernègues.

Works

 Les Grandes Formes de la Musique, l’œuvre de Camille Saint-Saëns (1905).
 L'Immolé (1909).
 La Fosse aux Lions (1911).
 Trois Villes Saintes: Ars en Dombes, Saint Jacques de Compostelle, Le Mont Saint Michel (1912).
 Le Baptême de Pauline Ardel (1913).
 La Paix du Septième Jour (1917).
 L’Abbé Chevoleau, Caporal au 90e d’Infanterie (1919).
 Le Fer sur l'Enclume (1920).
 Heures d’été au Mont Saint-Michel (1920).
 Job le Prédestiné (1922).
 L’Anneau d’or des Grands Mystiques, de Saint-Augustin à Catherine Emmerich (1924).
 Saint Paul (1925).
 Le Signe sur les Mains (1926).
 Intermèdes (1927).
 Mon Frère Dominicain (1927).
 Les Chartreux (1928).
 Bossuet Moraliste (1929).
 Les Douze Collines (1929).
 Abel et Caïn (1930).
 Marie-Antoinette et Axel Fersen (1931).
 Le Mont Saint-Michel (1932).
 Le Cantique Éternel La Symphonie du Désir (1933). 
 Amour et Sagesse (1934).
  Lyon et le Lyonnais (1934).
 Héloïse, L’Amante et l’Abbesse (1934).
 La Vie Terrible d’Henry de Groux (1936).
 Comment Vivent les Chartreux (1936).
 L'Excommunié (1939).
 Histoire des Pèlerinages de la Sainte Vierge (1941).

Posthumous
 Mémoires (1943).
 Les Nourritures Célestes (1943).
 Shéhérazade (1943).
 Histoire des Pèlerinages de la Chrétienté (1948).
 Pierre Puget, Sculpteur, 1620-1694 (1949).

Articles
 "Toulon et Pierre Puget", La Revue Hebdomadaire, No. 10 (1914).
 "Quand Dieu Parle", La Revue Universelle, No. 15  (1926).
 "Mon frère le Dominicain: Son Enfance et sa Mort", Chroniques,  No. 4 (1927).
 "Les Chartreux, les Statuts et le Gouvernement d’un Grand Ordre", La Revue Universelle, (1928).

Works in English translation
 Saint Paul (1929).
 "The Catholic and Supernatural Novel." In: Fiction by its Makers (1928).

Notes

Further reading
 Alexander, Calvert (1935). The Catholic Literary Revival. Milwaukee: Bruce Pub.
 Lawhead, Alice (1941). The Reversibility of Grace in the Novels of Emile Baumann. (M.A.) Thesis: University of Notre Dame.
 McMahon, A. (1912). "Catholic Ideals in Modern French Fiction," The American Catholic Quarterly Review, Vol. XXXVII, pp. 697–717.
 Seeley, Paul Alan (1995). Virile Pursuits: Youth, Religion, and Bourgeois Family Politics in Lyon on the Eve of the French Third Republic.'' (M.A.) Thesis: University of Michigan.

External links
 

1868 births
1941 deaths
20th-century French novelists
20th-century French male writers
French Roman Catholics
Roman Catholic writers
French male novelists